William Redman (c. 1541/2 – 25 September 1602) was an English bishop.

Early life
He was educated at Trinity College, Cambridge from 1559, gaining his BA in 1562/3 and becoming a fellow of Trinity in 1563.

Career
Ordained in 1570, he was made Archdeacon of Canterbury by Edmund Grindal in 1576. He was elected Bishop of Norwich on 17 December 1594, and consecrated on 10 January 1595.

Family
Redman married twice, first to Elizabeth Hanchett and secondly to Isabel Calverley.

References

1540s births
1602 deaths
17th-century Church of England bishops
Bishops of Norwich
Archdeacons of Canterbury
Alumni of Trinity College, Cambridge
16th-century Church of England bishops
Burials at Norwich Cathedral